Gavin Rees (born 10 May 1980) is a retired Welsh former professional boxing world champion who competed from 1998 to 2014. He held the WBA super lightweight title from 2007 to 2008 and challenged once for the WBC lightweight title in 2013. At regional level, he held the British lightweight title twice between 2010 and 2012, and the EBU European lightweight title from 2011 to 2012.

Career 
After a successful amateur career, Rees turned professional in 1998.

World champion 
In 2007, Rees defeated Souleymane M'baye to become the WBA Light Welterweight champion with a unanimous decision after 12 rounds.

Rees however lost his World title in his first defence via a 12th-round TKO loss to Andreas Kotelnik in March 2008.

Further success 
Following his world title loss Rees was out of action for more than a year before returning in August 2009 to beat Johnny Greaves in 4 rounds. On 4 December, Rees entered the light welterweight prizefighter competition beating Ted Bami in the quarter finals, Jason Cook in the Semi-finals and Colin Lynes in the Final to win the £32,000 prize

Following his Prizefighter victory, Rees moved down to the (lightweight) division where he enjoyed instant success winning the British title in 2010 (which he then vacated). He has since won the European title in June 2011 and most recently regained the British title in July 2012.

Rees fought Adrien Broner for the World Boxing Council lightweight world title at Boardwalk Hall in Atlantic City, New Jersey on 16 February 2013. He lost the fight via 5th-round TKO.

Personal life
Rees lives in Pantside, Wales and has five children all girls. Rees is now a boxing trainer in his hometown of Pantside, Newbridge at The Rocks Gym.

Professional boxing record

See also

 List of Welsh boxing world champions

List of world light-welterweight boxing champions
List of British world boxing champions

References

External links

|-

|-

1980 births
Living people
Welsh male boxers
People from Newbridge, Caerphilly
Sportspeople from Caerphilly County Borough
Lightweight boxers
Prizefighter contestants
British Boxing Board of Control champions
European Boxing Union champions
World light-welterweight boxing champions
World Boxing Association champions